Enallylpropymal (Narconumal) is a barbiturate derivative developed by Hoffman la Roche in the 1930s. It has sedative and hypnotic effects and is considered to have a moderate abuse potential.

References 

Barbiturates
Allyl compounds
GABAA receptor positive allosteric modulators